Josh Healey (born July 12, 1994) is a Canadian professional ice hockey defenceman who is currently playing for the San Diego Gulls of the American Hockey League (AHL), the Founder of The Sports Aux Hockey Top Recruiting Platform.

Playing career 
Healey began his career in the Alberta Junior Hockey League (AJHL), playing parts of three seasons for the Sherwood Park Crusaders between 2010 and 2013. While Healey went unselected in the NHL Entry Draft, he attracted American college interest and committed to Ohio State University to play for the Buckeyes beginning with the 2013–14 Division I season.

Healey played with Ohio State for four years, emerging as one of the top players on the Big Ten team. He was named to the Big Ten's year-end all-star teams twice: to the first team in 2015–16 Division I season, and to the second team in 2016–17. During his final season with the team, on February 13, 2017, Healey was suspended two games by the Big Ten for a high hit against the University of Minnesota Golden Gophers. One NHL scout remarked of Healey that he "hits too hard for college hockey," but that "his game will be better suited for pro." Just over a month later, Healey turned professional by signing a two-year entry-level deal with the Calgary Flames of the National Hockey League (NHL).

At the conclusion of his entry-level deal with the Flames, Healey was not tendered a qualifying offer on June 25, 2019, enabling him to become a free agent. He was signed to a one-year AHL contract with the Milwaukee Admirals, affiliate to the Nashville Predators on August 2, 2019.

Continuing to play through Predators affiliation's, joining the Chicago Wolves for the pandemic delayed 2020–21 season, after 20 regular season contests Healey was signed by the Nashville Predators to add depth to the blueline on a two-way contract for the remainder of the year on April 11, 2021.

With the AHL season completed, Healey continued within the Predators organization returning to the Milwaukee Admirals on a one-year AHL contract on May 19, 2021.

Career statistics

References

External links 

 

1994 births
Living people
Canadian ice hockey defencemen
Chicago Wolves players
Milwaukee Admirals players
Ohio State Buckeyes men's ice hockey players
San Diego Gulls (AHL) players
Sherwood Park Crusaders players
Ice hockey people from Edmonton
Stockton Heat players